Unspoken is a one-woman play written by Rebecca Clarke. It was first performed in 2005 and has been toured around Australia since. The show is also performed by Rebecca Clarke.
The play tells the author's semi-autobiographical story about what it is like to have a brother with severe disabilities.
Unspoken is the winner of Best Independent Production and Best Newcomer at the 2005 Sydney Theatre Awards.

References
 https://books.google.com.au/books/about/Unspoken.html?id=7OTZAAAACAAJ&redir_esc=y
 http://www.abc.net.au/radionational/programs/lifematters/rebecca-clarke-unspoken/3341178
 http://www.abc.net.au/radionational/programs/airplay/unspoken-by-rebecca-clarke/3229046
 http://www.smh.com.au/news/arts-reviews/unspoken/2006/08/30/1156816949620.html
 https://australianplays.org/assets/files/resource/doc/UnspokenStudyGuide.pdf
 http://chrisboyd.blogspot.com.au/2006/07/brisbane-festival-and-performing-lines.html
 https://riversideparramatta.com.au/show/unspoken/
 https://australianplays.org/playwright/CP-clapot
 http://www.realtimearts.net/article/74/8186

External links
 https://eprints.qut.edu.au/54666/1/Rebecca_Clarke_Thesis.pdf
 Library holdings of Unspoken

2005 plays
Australian plays